The 1923 Southern Conference football season was the college football games played by the member schools of the Southern Conference as part of the 1923 college football season. The season began on September 29. Conference play began  with Auburn hosting Clemson. The game was fought to a scoreless tie.

Vanderbilt and Washington & Lee finished the season as conference co-champions. A poll of sportswriters elected Vanderbilt as best team in the south, awarding it the Champ Pickens Trophy.

Vanderbilt end Lynn Bomar was the last of the few southern players selected a first-team All-American by Walter Camp.

Florida's upset of Alabama under new head coach Wallace Wade in the rain opened the door for Vanderbilt's claim to the SoCon title.

Season overview

Results and team statistics

Key

PPG = Average of points scored per game
PAG = Average of points allowed per game

Regular season

SoCon teams in bold.

Week One

Week Two

Week Three

Week Four

Week Five

Week Six

Week Seven

Week Eight

Week Nine

Week Ten

Awards and honors

All-Americans

E – Lynn Bomar, Vanderbilt (AW-2; WC-1; FW)
E – Hek Wakefield, Vanderbilt (NB-2; DW-1, BE)
T – Joe Bennett, Georgia (BE)
T – Robbie Robinson, Florida (BE)
G – Goldy Goldstein, Florida (BE)
G – Tuck Kelly, Vanderbilt (BE)
C – Clyde Propst, Alabama (BE)
C – Claire Frye, Georgia Tech (BE)
HB – Gil Reese, Vanderbilt (DW-3, BE)
FB – Doug Wycoff, Georgia Tech (BE)

All-Southern team

The following were the selections for the composite All-Southern team put out by the Atlanta Journal, all of whom received gold medals.

References